Frances Ann Hurley is the Illinois state representative for the 35th district. The 35th district includes the Mount Greenwood neighborhoods of Chicago along with all or part of Orland Park, Orland Hills, Palos Heights, Palos Park, Worth, Oak Lawn, Alsip, Merrionette Park and Evergreen Park. On February 17, 2023, Governor J. B. Pritzker announced his intention to appoint Hurley to the Illinois Labor Relations Board.

Early life and career
Hurley was an aide to Alderwoman Virginia Rugai and Rugai's successor Alderman Matthew O'Shea. She also spent time in the Cook County Sheriff's Office as a Project Manager with an emphasis on officer wellness.

Illinois House of Representatives
Hurley was elected to the Illinois House of Representatives in the 2012 general election. She succeeded Bill Cunningham who was elected to the Illinois Senate. Governor J. B. Pritzker submitted Hurley's name to the Illinois Senate for an appointment to the Illinois State Labor Relations Board for a term beginning March 1, 2023. On February 24, 2023, Hurley announced her resignation from the Illinois House of Representatives effective on February 28, 2023.

Committee assignments
As of July 3, 2022, Representative Hurley was a member of the following Illinois House committees:

 Cities & Villages Committee (HCIV)
 Elementary & Secondary Education: School Curriculum & Policies Committee (HELM)
 (Chairwoman of) Firefighters and First Responders Subcommittee (SHPF-FIRE)
 Labor & Commerce Committee (HLBR)
 (Chairwoman of) Law Enforcement Subcommittee (SHPF-LAWE)
 Natural Gas Subcommittee (HPUB-NGAS)
 (Chairwoman of) Police & Fire Committee (SHPF)
 Public Utilities Committee (HPUB)
 Small Business, Tech Innovation, and Entrepreneurship Committee (SBTE)
 Telecom/Video Subcommittee (HPUB-TVID)
 Transportation: Vehicles & Safety Committee (HVES)
 Wages Policy & Sturdy Subcommittee (HLBR-WAGE)

Electoral history

References

External links
Representative Frances Ann Hurley (D) at the Illinois General Assembly
 
Rep. Fran Hurley at Illinois House Democrats

Living people
Saint Xavier University alumni
Women state legislators in Illinois
Democratic Party members of the Illinois House of Representatives
Year of birth missing (living people)
21st-century American politicians
21st-century American women politicians